DIVA was a South Korean hip-hop girl group that debuted in 1997 with members Chae Ri-na, Vicky, and Ji Ni. After the release of the group's first two albums, Funky Diva (1997) and Snappy Diva (1998), Ji Ni left the group and was replaced by new member Lee Min Kyoung. After the release of the group's third album Millennium (1999), Chae Ri-na left the group and Ji Ni re-joined. DIVA went on to release the albums Naughty Diva (2000), Perfect (2001), Luxury Diva (2002), Renaissance (2004), and Only Diva (2005) before disbanding in 2005.

History

1997-1999: - Debut with Funky Diva, Snappy Diva, Millenium, Dream and line-up changes 
DIVA debuted with their first album titled Funky Diva in 1997 and their singles there was Yeah and Drama of December. Their single Yeah was popular in Korea peaking at number 5 at music charts. Their album sold about 270,000 copies. 

DIVA released their second album titled Snappy Diva in the summer of 1998 with singles titled Why (do you call me)? and Joy. Their single Why (do you call me)? was very popular, peaking at number 1 at music charts and was later remade by the girl group C.I.V.A, in 2016. Their single Joy was also popular. Their second album sold over 240,000 copies.

DIVA released their third album titled Millenium with singles Yo Yo and Feel It in 1999. Their single Yo Yo peaked at number 3 in music charts and was also popular. Their third album sold over 100,000 copies. After the promotions, they released their English Album titled Dream in Taiwan with the single I'll Get Your Love and was popular in Taiwan selling over 30,000 copies. However, after their promotions in Taiwan, leader Chae Rina left and Lee Min Kyoung was added.

2000-2002 - Naughty Diva, Perfect! and Luxury Diva 
DIVA released their fourth album titled Naughty Diva in 2000, with the singles Up & Down and In This Winter. DIVA still remained popular even though popular member and leader Chae Rina left the group. Their album sold 112,788 copies.

DIVA released their fifth album titled Perfect! in 2001 with singles Perfect! and DVD. Perfect! peaked at #6 in music charts. The album sold 69,069+ copies in 2001.

DIVA released their sixth album, a feat achieved by few girl groups in Korea, titled Luxury Diva which saw DIVA change their styles with luxurious and dark concepts. Their singles where Lust in the Wind and Action. Their album was less popular than their last 5 albums with Action peaking only at number 14 in music charts. The album sold about 46,840 copies.

2003-2005 - Best, Renaissance, Only Diva and disbandment 
DIVA released their first compilation album in 2003 titled Best compiling their popular singles during their active times in Korea from 1997 to 2002. The album sold about 20,000 copies.

DIVA released their seventh album titled Renaissance with singles Hey Boy and Amoremio. Their single Hey Boy peaked at number 11 and their seventh album sold about 17,797 copies.

DIVA released their eight and last album before disbandment titled Only Diva with singles Smile and My Style. Their music video for Smile was filmed in China. This album sold 20,000 copies in Korea. After their promotions, DIVA announced their disbandment to focus on solo activities.

Artistry

DIVA's artistry and genre was different from the other girl groups out there at their active time. S.E.S & Fin.K.L have both a poppy genre, Baby V.O.X have a dance genre. But DIVA have a hip-hop genre that loved by many people in South Korea. DIVA was also popular in some Asian Countries like China and Taiwan. DIVA was known for having energetic and groovy music and videos that was peculiar at the height of their career.

Discography

Studio albums

English albums
Dream (1999)

Compilation albums
Best World (2003)

Awards and nominations

References

South Korean girl groups
South Korean dance music groups
Musical groups established in 1997
Musical groups disestablished in 2005
K-pop music groups
1997 establishments in South Korea